Ignite The Genius Within is a multi-media creativity book co-authored by author and journalist Christopher Lee Nutter and EMDR therapist Dr. Christine Ranck. It was published by Dutton Penguin in March, 2009. The book uses visuals with audio stimulus created by Dr. David Grand derived from EMDR trauma therapy to the end of enhancing creativity. It was endorsed by performance artist Laurie Anderson and actress / playwright Sarah Jones (stage actress).

External links
Publisher’s website
Publishers Weekly article
Author’s website

2009 non-fiction books
Dutton Penguin books
Creativity